Polyipnus tridentifer, commonly known as the three-spined hatchetfish, is a species of ray-finned fish in the family Sternoptychidae.

References

Sternoptychidae
Fish described in 1914
Taxa named by Allan Riverstone McCulloch